Elwood Township:

 Elwood Township, Barber County, Kansas;
 Elwood Township, Vermilion County, Illinois.